Étang de Hanau (literally "Hanau Pond") is a lake in Moselle, France. Its surface area is 0.16 km².

The lake is located in the commune of Philippsbourg, near the small hamlet of Waldeck and its castle.

Hanau
Landforms of Moselle (department)